AT&T Inc. is an American multinational telecommunications holding company headquartered at Whitacre Tower in Downtown Dallas, Texas.

During most of the 20th century, AT&T had a monopoly on phone service in the United States. The company began its history as the American District Telegraph Company, formed in St. Louis in 1878. After expanding services to Arkansas, Kansas, Oklahoma and Texas, through a series of mergers, it became Southwestern Bell Telephone Company in 1920, which was then a subsidiary of American Telephone and Telegraph Company. The latter was a successor of the original Bell Telephone Company founded by Alexander Graham Bell in 1877. The American Bell Telephone Company formed the American Telephone and Telegraph Company (AT&T) subsidiary in 1885. In 1899, AT&T became the parent company after the American Bell Telephone Company sold its assets to its subsidiary. The company was rebranded as AT&T Corp. in 1994. The 1982 United States v. AT&T antitrust lawsuit resulted in the divestiture of AT&T's ("Ma Bell") local operating subsidiaries which were grouped into seven Regional Bell Operating Companies (RBOCs), commonly referred to as "Baby Bells", resulting in seven independent companies, including Southwestern Bell Corporation (SBC). The latter changed its name to SBC Communications Inc. in 1995.

In 2005, SBC purchased its former parent AT&T Corp. and took on its branding, with the merged entity naming itself AT&T Inc. and using its history, a version of its iconic logo and stock-trading symbol which launched on December 30, 2005. AT&T Inc. acquired BellSouth Corporation in 2006, the last independent Baby Bell company, making its formerly joint venture Cingular Wireless (which had acquired AT&T Wireless in 2004) wholly owned and rebranding it as AT&T Mobility. AT&T Inc. also acquired Time Warner in 2016, with the proposed merger confirming on June 12, 2018 and the aim of making AT&T the largest and controlling shareholder of Time Warner and rebranding it as WarnerMedia in 2018. The company later withdrew its equity stake in WarnerMedia in 2022 and merged it with Discovery, Inc. to create Warner Bros. Discovery, divesting itself of its media arm.

The current AT&T reconstitutes much of the former Bell System, and includes four of the seven "Baby Bells" along with the original AT&T Corp., including the long-distance division.

History

Origin and growth (1885–1981) 

AT&T was founded as Bell Telephone Company by Alexander Graham Bell, Thomas Watson and Gardiner Greene Hubbard after Bell's patenting of the telephone in 1875. By 1881, Bell Telephone Company had become the American Bell Telephone Company. One of its subsidiaries was the American Telephone and Telegraph Company (AT&T), established in 1885. On December 30, 1899, AT&T acquired the assets of its parent American Bell Telephone, becoming the new parent company. AT&T established a network of local telephone subsidiaries in the United States. AT&T and its subsidiaries held a phone service monopoly, authorized in 1913 by government authorities with the Kingsbury Commitment, throughout most of the twentieth century. This monopoly was known as the Bell System, and during this period, AT&T was also known by the nickname Ma Bell.

Breakup and reformation (1982–2004) 

In 1982, U.S. regulators broke up the AT&T monopoly, requiring AT&T to divest its local subsidiaries, which it did by grouping them into seven individual companies. These new companies were known as Regional Bell Operating Companies, or more informally, Baby Bells. AT&T continued to operate long-distance services but faced increasing competition from overseas supplied competitors such as MCI and Sprint.

Southwestern Bell Corporation (SBC) was one of the companies created by the breakup of AT&T Corp. The company soon started a series of acquisitions, including the 1987 acquisition of Metromedia mobile business and the acquisition of several cable companies in the early 1990s. In the latter half of the 1990s, the company acquired several other telecommunications companies, including two Baby Bells (Pacific Telesis Group and Ameritech Corporation), while selling its cable business. During this time, the company changed its name to SBC Communications Inc. In early 1997 C. Michael Armstrong was named CEO, and Armstrong appointed John Zeglis as president later in that same year. By 1998, the company was in the top 15 of the Fortune 500, and by 1999, when Zeglis assumed the positions of chairman and CEO of AT&T Wireless, AT&T was part of the Dow Jones Industrial Average (lasting through 2015). Zeglis ended his service as president of AT&T in 2001 and resigned from his positions in AT&T Wireless in 2004.

Purchase of former parent and acquisitions (2005–2013) 

On November 18, 2005, SBC Communications, Inc.based in San Antonio, purchased AT&T Corp. for $16 billion. After this purchase, SBC adopted the better-known AT&T name and brand, with the original AT&T Corp. still existing as the long-distance landline subsidiary of the merged company. The current AT&T Inc. claims the original AT&T Corp.'s history (dating to 1877) as its own, but retains SBC's pre-2005 corporate structure and stock price history. As well, all SEC filings before 2005 are under SBC, not AT&T.

AT&T made an attempt in 2011 to purchase T-Mobile for a $39 billion stock and cash offer. The bid was withdrawn after the takeover company was faced with significant regulatory and legal hurdles, along with heavy resistance from the U.S. government. As per the original acquisition agreement, T-Mobile received $3 billion in cash as well as access to $1 billion worth of AT&T-held wireless spectrum.

In September 2013, AT&T announced it would expand into Latin America through a collaboration with América Móvil. In December 2013, AT&T announced plans to sell its Connecticut wireline operations to Stamford-based Frontier Communications.

AT&T acquired BellSouth Corporation on December 29, 2006, following FCC approval. The transaction consolidated ownership and management of Cingular Wireless. AT&T rebranded its wireless retail stores from Cingular to AT&T in January 2007.

Recent developments (2013–present) 

In late 2014, AT&T purchased Mexican cellular carrier Iusacell, and two months later, it purchased the Mexican wireless business of NII Holdings. AT&T merged the two companies to create AT&T Mexico.

In July 2015, AT&T purchased DirecTV for $48.5 billion. AT&T then announced plans to converge its existing U-verse home internet and IPTV brands with DirecTV, to create AT&T Entertainment.

On October 22, 2016, AT&T announced a deal to buy Time Warner for $108.7 billion in an effort to increase its media holdings. On November 20, 2017, Assistant Attorney General Makan Delrahim filed a lawsuit for the United States Department of Justice Antitrust Division to block the merger with Time Warner, saying it "will harm competition, result in higher bills for consumers and less innovation." On June 12, 2018, U.S. District Court Judge Richard J. Leon ruled that the merger could go forward. The merger closed two days afterwards, with Time Warner becoming a wholly owned subsidiary of AT&T. A day later, the company was renamed WarnerMedia. Among other key assets, the acquisition of WarnerMedia by AT&T included the Warner Bros. film and television studios, U.S. cable/satellite channels such as HBO, Adult Swim, Boomerang, Cartoon Network, CNN, TBS, TNT, TruTV, Turner Classic Movies and a 50% stake in The CW (ViacomCBS, now Paramount Global, owns the other 50%).

Three months after completing the acquisition, AT&T reorganized into four main units: Communications, including consumer and business wireline telephony, AT&T Mobility, and consumer entertainment video services; WarnerMedia, including Turner cable television networks, Warner Bros. film and television production, and HBO; AT&T Latin America, consisting of wireless service in Mexico and video in Latin America and the Caribbean under the Vrio brand; and Advertising and Analytics, since renamed Xandr.

On July 13, 2017, it was reported that AT&T would introduce a cloud-based DVR streaming service as part of its effort to create a unified platform across DirecTV and its DirecTV Now streaming service, with U-verse to be added soon. The service, named HBO Max, launched in May 2020.

On September 12, 2017, it was reported that AT&T planned to launch a new cable TV-like service for delivery over-the-top over its own or a competitor's broadband network sometime the following year.

On March 7, 2018, the company prepared to sell a minority stake of DirecTV Latin America through an IPO, creating a new holding company for those assets named Vrio Corp. However, on April 18, just a day before the public debut of Vrio, AT&T canceled the IPO due to market conditions.

, AT&T is the world's largest telecommunications company. AT&T is also the largest provider of mobile telephone services and the largest provider of fixed telephone services in the United States.

In September 2019, activist investor Elliott Management revealed that it had purchased $3.2 billion of AT&T stock (a 1.2% equity interest), and had pushed for the company to divest assets to improve its share value.

On March 4, 2020, AT&T announced its intent to perform major cost-cutting moves, including cuts to capital investment, and plans to promote AT&T TV (which officially launched nationally on March 2) as its primary pay television service offering. AT&T stated it would still primarily promote DirecTV "where cable broadband is not prevalent", and as a specialty option.

On April 24, 2020, AT&T announced that effective July 1, 2020, company COO John Stankey would replace Randall L. Stephenson as CEO of AT&T. It was also acknowledged that AT&T's acquisitions of DirecTV and Time Warner had by this point resulted in a massive debt burden of $200 billion for the company.

As a result of planned cost cutting programs, the sale of Warner Bros. Interactive Entertainment was proposed, but ultimately abandoned due to COVID-19 pandemic-related growth in the Gaming industry, as well as a positive reception to upcoming DC Comics, Lego Star Wars, and Harry Potter titles from fans and critics.

On February 25, 2021, AT&T announced that it would spin-off DirecTV, U-Verse TV, and DirecTV Stream into a separate entity, selling a 30% stake to TPG Capital (owners of Astound Broadband cable), while retaining a 70% stake in the new standalone company. The deal was closed on August 2, 2021.

On May 17, 2021, AT&T announced plans to relinquish its equity interest in WarnerMedia, and have it merge with Discovery, Inc. in a  deal to establish a new media company.

In September 2021, Fox Corporation acquired TMZ from WarnerMedia in a deal worth about $50 million with TMZ being operated under the Fox Entertainment division.

On December 21, 2021, AT&T announced that they had agreed to sell Xandr (and AppNexus) to Microsoft for an undisclosed price. The deal was completed in June 2022.

On April 8, 2022, the spinoff of WarnerMedia and its subsequent merger with Discovery, Inc. to form Warner Bros. Discovery was completed. As a result of this merger, HBO Max and other video services were dropped from AT&T's unlimited plan offering.

Landline operating companies 
Of the eight companies that were part of the Breakup of the Bell System, these five are a part of the current AT&T:
 Ameritech, acquired by SBC in 1999
 AT&T Corp., acquired by SBC in 2005
 BellSouth, acquired by AT&T in 2006
 Pacific Telesis, acquired by SBC in 1997
 Southwestern Bell, rebranded as SBC Communications in 1995

Chart of AT&T Baby Bells

Former operating companies 
The following companies have become defunct or were sold under SBC/AT&T ownership:
 Southern New England Telephone: sold to Frontier Communications in 2014.
Woodbury Telephone: merged into Southern New England Telephone on June 1, 2007.

Decline of rural landlines 
Of the Baby Bells, Ameritech sold some of its Wisconsin landlines to CenturyTel, in 1998; BellSouth sold some of its lines to MebTel, during the 2000s; US West sold many historically Bell landlines to Lynch Communications and Pacific Telecom, in the 1990s; Verizon sold many of its New England lines to FairPoint, in 2008, and its West Virginia operations to Frontier Communications, in 2010.

On October 25, 2014, Frontier Communications took over control of the AT&T landline network in Connecticut after being approved by state utility regulators. The deal was worth about $2 billion, and included Frontier inheriting about 2,500 of AT&T's employees and many of AT&T's buildings.

Corporate structure

Facilities and regions 

The company is headquartered at Whitacre Tower in downtown Dallas, Texas. On June 27, 2008, AT&T announced that it would move its corporate headquarters from downtown San Antonio to One AT&T Plaza in downtown Dallas. The company said that it moved to gain better access to its customers and operations throughout the world, and to the key technology partners, suppliers, innovation and human resources needed as it continues to grow, domestically and internationally. AT&T Inc. previously relocated its corporate headquarters to San Antonio from St. Louis, Missouri, in 1992, when it was then named Southwestern Bell Corporation. The company's Telecom Operations group, which serves residential and regional business customers in 22 U.S. states, remains in San Antonio. Atlanta, Georgia, continues to be the headquarters for AT&T Mobility, with significant offices in Redmond, Washington, the former home of AT&T Wireless. Bedminster, New Jersey, is the headquarters for the company's Global Business Services group and AT&T Labs and is where the original AT&T Corp. remains located. St. Louis continues as home to the company's Directory operations, AT&T Advertising Solutions.

AT&T also offers services in many locations throughout the Asia Pacific; its regional headquarters is located in Hong Kong. The company is also active in Mexico, and on November 7, 2014, it was announced that Mexican carrier Iusacell would be acquired by AT&T. The acquisition was approved in January 2015. On April 30, 2015, AT&T acquired wireless operations Nextel Mexico from NII Holdings (now AT&T Mexico).

Corporate governance 

AT&T's current board of directors :

The current management  includes:
 John Stankey – Chief executive officer
 Thaddeus Arroyo – Chief Strategy and Development Officer
 Pascal Desroches – Senior Executive Vice President & Chief financial officer
 Ed Gillespie – Senior Executive Vice President - External and Legislative Affairs
 David S. Huntley – Senior Executive Vice President & Chief compliance officer
 Kellyn Smith Kenny – Chief Marketing & Growth Officer
 Lori Lee – CEO – AT&T Latin America & Global Marketing Officer
 Jeremy Legg – Chief Technology Officer, AT&T Services, Inc.
 David R. McAtee II – Senior Executive Vice President and General counsel
 Jeff McElfresh – CEO, AT&T Communications
 Angela Santone – Senior Executive Vice President – Human resources

Political involvement 

As an example, in 2005, AT&T was among 53 entities that contributed the maximum of $250,000 to the second inauguration of President George W. Bush. Bill Leahy, representing AT&T, sits on the Private Enterprise Board of the American Legislative Exchange Council (ALEC). ALEC is a nonprofit organization of conservative state legislators and private sector representatives that drafts and shares model state-level legislation for distribution among state governments in the United States.

During the period of 1998 to 2019, the company expended  on lobbying in the United States. A key political issue for AT&T has been the question of which businesses win the right to profit by providing broadband internet access in the United States. The company has also lobbied in support of several federal bills. AT&T supported the Federal Communications Commission Process Reform Act of 2013 (H.R. 3675; 113th Congress), a bill that would make a number of changes to procedures that the U.S. Federal Communications Commission (FCC) follows in its rulemaking processes. The FCC would have to act in a more transparent way as a result of this bill, forced to accept public input about regulations. AT&T's Executive Vice President of Federal Relations, Tim McKone, said that the bill's "much needed institutional reforms will help arm the agency with the tools to keep pace with the Internet speed of today's marketplace. It will also ensure that outmoded regulatory practices for today's competitive marketplace are properly placed in the dustbin of history."

In May 2018, reports emerged that AT&T made 12 monthly payments between January and December 2017 to Essential Consultants, a company set up by President Donald Trump's lawyer Michael Cohen, totaling $600,000. Although initial reports on May 8 mentioned only four monthly payments totaling $200,000, documents obtained by the Washington Post on May 10 confirmed the figure of 12 payments, which had begun three days after the President was sworn into office. AT&T confirmed the report the same day. The report from The Washington Post, as well as additional reporting from Bloomberg, revealed the payments had been made for Cohen to "provide guidance" relating to the attempted $85 billion merger with Time Warner, to gain information on the Trump administration's planned tax reforms, as well as about potential changes to net neutrality policies under the new FCC. However, Chairman of the FCC Ajit Pai denied Cohen ever inquired about net neutrality on AT&T's behalf. A spokesperson for AT&T said that the company had been contacted by the Special Counsel investigation led by Robert Mueller regarding the payments, and had provided all the information requested in November and December 2017.

In early 2019, the Democratic House Judiciary requested records related to the AT&T-Time Warner merger from the White House.

While it has expressed support for LGBTQ causes, AT&T has also donated to sponsors of anti-transgender legislation in several US states, especially those predominantly Republican-governed, including Arkansas, Tennessee, North Carolina, Texas and Florida.

Historical financial performance 
The financial performance of the company is reported to shareholders on an annual basis and a matter of public record. Where performance has been restated, the most recent statement of performance from an annual report is used.

Carbon footprint
AT&T reported Total CO2e emissions (Direct + Indirect) for the twelve months ending 31 December 2020 at 5,788 Kt (-737 /-11.3% y-o-y) and plans to reduce emissions by 63% by 2030 from a 2015 base year. This science-based target is aligned with Paris Agreement to limit global warming to 1.5 °C above pre-industrial levels.

Criticism and controversies

Hemisphere database 

The company maintains a database of call detail records of all telephone calls that have passed through its network since 1987. AT&T employees work at High Intensity Drug Trafficking Area offices (operated by the Office of National Drug Control Policy) in Los Angeles, Atlanta, and Houston so data can be quickly turned over to law enforcement agencies. Records are requested via an administrative subpoena, without the involvement of a court or grand jury.

Censorship 
In September 2007, AT&T changed its legal policy to state that "AT&T may immediately terminate or suspend all or a portion of your Service, any Member ID, electronic mail address, IP address, Universal Resource Locator or domain name used by you, without notice for conduct that AT&T believes ... (c) tends to damage the name or reputation of AT&T, or its parents, affiliates and subsidiaries." By October 10, 2007, AT&T had altered the terms and conditions for its Internet service to explicitly support freedom of expression by its subscribers, after an outcry claiming the company had given itself the right to censor its subscribers' transmissions.

Privacy controversy 

In 2006, the Electronic Frontier Foundation lodged the class action lawsuit Hepting v. AT&T, which alleged that AT&T had allowed agents of the National Security Agency (NSA) to monitor phone and Internet communications of AT&T customers without warrants. If true, this would violate the Foreign Intelligence Surveillance Act of 1978 and the First and Fourth Amendments of the U.S. Constitution. AT&T has yet to confirm or deny that monitoring by the NSA is occurring. In April 2006, retired former AT&T technician Mark Klein lodged an affidavit supporting this allegation. The Department of Justice stated it would intervene in this lawsuit by means of State Secrets Privilege.

In July 2006, the United States District Court for the Northern District of California – in which the suit was filed – rejected a federal government motion to dismiss the case. The motion to dismiss, which invoked the State Secrets Privilege, had argued that any court review of the alleged partnership between the federal government and AT&T would harm national security. The case was immediately appealed to the Ninth Circuit. It was dismissed on June 3, 2009, citing retroactive legislation in the Foreign Intelligence Surveillance Act.

In May 2006, USA Today reported that all international and domestic calling records had been handed over to the National Security Agency by AT&T, Verizon, SBC, and BellSouth for the purpose of creating a massive calling database. The portions of the new AT&T that had been part of SBC Communications before November 18, 2005, were not mentioned.

On June 21, 2006, the San Francisco Chronicle reported that AT&T had rewritten rules on its privacy policy. The policy, which took effect June 23, 2006, says that "AT&T – not customers – owns customers' confidential info and can use it 'to protect its legitimate business interests, safeguard others, or respond to legal process.'"

On August 22, 2007, National Intelligence Director Mike McConnell confirmed that AT&T was one of the telecommunications companies that assisted with the government's warrantless wire-tapping program on calls between foreign and domestic sources.

On November 8, 2007, Mark Klein, a former AT&T technician, told Keith Olbermann of MSNBC that all Internet traffic passing over AT&T lines was copied into a locked room at the company's San Francisco office – to which only employees with National Security Agency clearance had access.

AT&T keeps for five to seven years a record of who text messages whom and the date and time, but not the content of the messages.

AT&T has a one star privacy rating from the Electronic Frontier Foundation.

Copyright enforcement 
In January 2008, reports emerged that the company planned to begin filtering all Internet traffic which passed through its network for intellectual property violations. Media commentators speculated that if this plan was implemented, it would have led to a mass exodus of subscribers from AT&T, although Internet traffic of non-subscribers may have gone through the company's network anyway. Internet freedom proponents used these developments as justification for government-mandated network neutrality.

Under AT&T's current copyright enforcement program, content owners may notify AT&T when they allege unlawful sharing of material. The program is based on IP addresses visible to content owners in peer-to-peer networks, not on filtering. AT&T has terminated the broadband service of some customers accused of copyright infringement.

Discrimination against local public-access television channels 
In 2009 AT&T was accused by community media groups of discriminating against local public, educational, and government access (PEG) cable TV channels, by "impictions that will severely restrict the audience".

According to Barbara Popovic, executive director of the Chicago public-access service CAN-TV, the new AT&T U-verse system forced all Public-access television into a special menu system, denying normal functionality such as channel numbers, access to the standard program guide, and DVR recording. The Ratepayer Advocates division of the California Public Utilities Commission reported: "Instead of putting the stations on individual channels, AT&T has bundled community stations into a generic channel that can only be navigated through a complex and lengthy process."

Sue Buske (president of telecommunications consulting firm the Buske Group and a former head of the National Federation of Local Cable Programmers/Alliance for Community Media) argue that this is "an overall attack [...] on public access across the [United States], the place in the dial around cities and communities where people can make their own media in their own communities".

Information security 
In June 2010, a hacker group known as Goatse Security discovered a vulnerability within AT&T that could allow anyone to uncover email addresses belonging to customers of AT&T 3G service for the Apple iPad. These email addresses could be accessed without a protective password. Using a script, Goatse Security collected thousands of email addresses from AT&T. Goatse Security informed AT&T about the security flaw through a third party. Goatse Security then disclosed around 114,000 of these emails to Gawker Media, which published an article about the security flaw and disclosure in Valleywag. Praetorian Security Group criticized the web application that Goatse Security exploited as "poorly designed".

In April 2015, AT&T was fined $25 million over data security breaches, marking the largest ever fine issued by the Federal Communications Commission (FCC) for breaking data privacy laws. The investigation revealed the theft of details of approximately 280,000 people from call centres in Mexico, Colombia and the Philippines.

Accusations of enabling fraud 
In March 2012, the United States federal government announced a lawsuit against AT&T. The specific accusations state that AT&T "violated the False Claims Act by facilitating and seeking federal payment for IP Relay calls by international callers who were ineligible for the service and sought to use it for fraudulent purposes. The complaint alleges that, out of fears that fraudulent call volume would drop after the registration deadline, AT&T knowingly adopted a non-compliant registration system that did not verify whether the user was located within the United States. The complaint further contends that AT&T continued to employ this system even with the knowledge that it facilitated the use of IP Relay by fraudulent foreign callers, which accounted for up to 95 percent of AT&T's call volume. The government's complaint alleges that AT&T improperly billed the TRS Fund for reimbursement of these calls and received millions of dollars in federal payments as a result." In 2013, AT&T entered into a consent decree with the FCC and paid a total of $21.75 million.

Aaron Slator controversy 
On April 28, 2015, AT&T announced that it had fired Aaron Slator, President of Content and Advertising Sales, for sending text messages critics described as racist. African-American employee Knoyme King filed a $100 million defamation lawsuit against Slator. The day before that, protesters arrived at AT&T's headquarters in Dallas and its satellite offices in Los Angeles as well as at the home of CEO Randall Stephenson to protest alleged systemic racial policies. According to accounts, the protesters demanded that AT&T begin working with 100% black-owned media companies.

On January 24, 2017, Slator sued AT&T in the Los Angeles Superior Court, accusing the company of defamation and wrongful termination. Slator had been involved in organizing AT&T's planned $48.5 billion acquisition of DirecTV since 2014, and he claimed that when news headlines speculated that his text messages could prevent the acquisition from going through, he was fired as a "scapegoat" by company executives. He also claimed that the executives had known about the text messages since at least late 2013, and had promised him at the time that he would not be fired for them. The company stood by its decision to terminate Slator.

Overcharging government agencies 
In 2020 AT&T paid out $48 million to settle a lawsuit with 30 government entities. The suit (under the California False Claims Act) related to contractual undertakings to provide services at "the lowest cost available". AT&T denied any wrongdoing in the matter.

One America News Network 
An investigative report by Reuters in 2021 revealed that AT&T played a key role in creating, funding and sustaining One America News Network (OAN), a far-right TV network known for promoting conspiracy theories. According to 2020 sworn testimony by an OAN accountant, 90% of OAN's revenue came from AT&T. According to OAN founder Robert Herring Sr., AT&T wanted to create a conservative network to compete with Fox News. Court documents showed OAN promised to "cast a positive light" on AT&T during newscasts. AT&T denied the allegations. Comedian John Oliver criticized AT&T in his weekly show for funding OAN.

Leaking data to Wall Street 

In March 2021 the U.S. Securities and Exchange Commission (SEC) filed suit against AT&T and three of its executives for violating the Fair Disclosure Rule against making selective disclosures of "material nonpublic information" to analysts and others. The SEC alleged that beginning in early 2016 these executives leaked key information to Wall Street analysts in order to manipulate revenue forecasts for the company.

In December 2022, without acknowledging any guilt, AT&T agreed to pay $6.25 million in fines to settle the lawsuit. The individual executives were also on the hook for $25,000 each.

Naming rights and sponsorships

Buildings 

 Whitacre Tower (One AT&T Plaza) – corporate headquarters, Dallas, Texas
 AT&T 220 Building – building in Indianapolis, Indiana
 AT&T Building – building in Detroit, Michigan
 AT&T Building – building in Indianapolis, Indiana
 AT&T Building – building in Kingman, Arizona
 AT&T Building – (aka "The Batman Building") in Nashville, Tennessee
 AT&T Building – building in Omaha, Nebraska
 AT&T Building Addition – building in Detroit, Michigan
 AT&T Building – building in San Diego
 AT&T Center – building in Los Angeles
 AT&T Center – building in St. Louis, Missouri
 AT&T City Center – building in Birmingham, Alabama
 AT&T Corporate Center – building in Chicago, Illinois
 AT&T Huron Road Building – skyscraper in Cleveland, Ohio
 AT&T Lenox Park Campus – AT&T Mobility Headquarters in DeKalb County just outside Atlanta, Georgia
 AT&T Midtown Center – building in Atlanta, Georgia
 AT&T Switching Center – building in Los Angeles
 AT&T Switching Center – building in Oakland, California
 AT&T Switching Center – building in San Francisco
 AT&T Tower – building in Minneapolis, Minnesota
 AT&T Building – building in Meriden, Connecticut
 AT&T Entertainment Group HQ – DirecTV corporate campus in El Segundo, California

Venues 

 AT&T Center – San Antonio, Texas (formerly SBC Center)
 AT&T Field – Chattanooga, Tennessee (formerly BellSouth Park)
 AT&T Plaza – Chicago, Illinois (public space that hosts the Cloud Gate sculpture in Millennium Park)
 AT&T Performing Arts Center – Dallas, Texas
 AT&T Stadium – Arlington, Texas (formerly Dallas Cowboys Stadium)
 AT&T Stadium – Glen Jean, West Virginia (outdoor open-seating stadium at the Boy Scouts of America's Summit Bechtel Reserve
 Jones AT&T Stadium – Lubbock, Texas (formerly Clifford B. and Audrey Jones Stadium, Jones SBC Stadium)

Sponsorships 
 100 Thieves (esports)
 AT&T Byron Nelson – Irving, Texas (golf)
 AT&T Pebble Beach National Pro-Am (golf)
 AT&T Red River Showdown – Dallas, Texas (formerly "Red River Rivalry", Red River Shootout, SBC Red River Rivalry) (football)
 Capitanes de Ciudad de México (basketball)
 Chicago Bulls (basketball)
 College Football Playoff National Championship
 Dallas Stars (ice hockey)
 Houston Rockets (basketball)
 Major League Soccer and the United States Soccer Federation, including the U.S. men's and U.S. women's national teams and the Major League Soccer All-Star Game from 2009
 Mexico national football team
 National Collegiate Athletic Association (Corporate Champion)
 National Basketball Association, Women's National Basketball Association, NBA G League, USA Basketball and NBA 2K League (basketball, esports)
 Red Bull Racing (Formula 1 racing team) – technical support and sponsorship, 2011 to 2020
 Cloud9, sponsorship since March 2019
 Club América – sponsorship since July 19, 2018

See also

References

External links 

 Corporate information
 
 Bell Operating Companies (from Bell System Memorial)

 AT&T History and science resources at The Franklin Institute's Case Files online exhibit

 
Bell System
1983 establishments in Texas
American companies established in 1983
Companies based in Dallas
Companies listed on the New York Stock Exchange
Former components of the Dow Jones Industrial Average
Holding companies of the United States
Holding companies established in 1983
Multinational companies headquartered in the United States
Technology companies established in 1983
Technology companies of the United States
Telecommunications companies established in 1983
Telecommunications companies of the United States